Groveville is an unincorporated community and census-designated place (CDP) located within Hamilton Township, in Mercer County, New Jersey, United States. As of the 2010 United States Census, the CDP's population was 2,945. Before the 2010 Census, the area was part of the Yardville-Groville CDP.

Geography
According to the United States Census Bureau, the CDP had a total area of 2.160 square miles (5.593 km2), including 2.123 square miles (5.498 km2) of land and 0.037 square miles (0.096 km2) of water (1.71%).

Demographics

2010 Census

References

Census-designated places in Mercer County, New Jersey
Hamilton Township, Mercer County, New Jersey